Especially for You is the eleventh studio album released by country music artist Don Williams. It was released in 1981 (see 1981 in country music). Three singles were released from the album which all reached the top ten. These were "Miracles" (#4), "If I Needed You" (with Emmylou Harris) (#3) and "Lord, I Hope This Day Is Good" (#1). The album peaked at #5 in the U.S. and reached #109 on the Billboard 200. This album, paired with his previous album, I Believe in You, were re-released on one CD in 1989.

Content
Many songs on this album are covers of earlier songs or would later be covered by other artists. "Fair-weather Friends" was released by its co-writer, Johnny Cash in 1982 on his album, The Adventures of Johnny Cash. "Years from now" was previously recorded by Bobbi Humphrey in 1977 and would later be made famous by Dr. Hook. "Lord, I Hope This Day is Good" has been covered by Anne Murray and by Lee Ann Womack on her 2000 album, I Hope You Dance. The duet with Emmylou Harris, "If I Needed You", was first recorded by Townes Van Zandt on his 1972 album, The Late Great Townes Van Zandt.

Track listing

Side one
"Fair-weather Friends" (Joe Allen, Johnny Cash) - 4:14
"I Don't Want to Love You" (Bob McDill) - 4:04
"Years from Now" (Roger Cook, Charles Cochran) - 2:41
"Lord, I Hope This Day Is Good" (Dave Hanner) - 4:06
"Especially You" (Rick Beresford) - 2:30

Side two
"If I Needed You" (Townes Van Zandt) - 3:25
Duet with Emmylou Harris
"Now and Then" (Wayland Holyfield) - 3:21
"Smooth Talking Baby" (David Kirby, Red Lane) - 3:07
"I've Got You to Thank for That" (Blake Mevis, Don Pfrimmer) - 2:32
"Miracles" (Cook) - 3:01

Production
All tracks produced by Don Williams and Garth Fundis except for "If I Needed You", which was co-produced with Brian Ahern.
Recorded at Sound Emporium Studios by Garth Fundis and Gary Laney
Remixed by Garth Fundis and Don Williams
Mastered by Glenn Meadows at Masterfonics, Nashville

Personnel
from liner notes
Don Williams - lead and backing vocals, acoustic guitar
Joe Allen - electric and upright bass
Charles Cochran - piano, organ, Prophet Synthesizer, string arrangements
Roger Cook - ukulele and harmony vocals on "Miracles"
Garth Fundis - harmony and backing vocals
Lloyd Green - steel guitar
David Kirby - acoustic guitar, electric guitar
Shelley Kurland - violin solo on "Now and Then"
Pat McLaughlin - mandolin
Kenny Malone - conga, bongos, tambourine, shakers, drums
Billy Sanford - acoustic guitar
Biff Watson - synthesizer, gut-string guitar
The Sheldon Kurland Strings - strings

Charts

Weekly charts

Year-end charts

Sources

1981 albums
Don Williams albums
Albums produced by Garth Fundis
MCA Records albums